Til Mavretič (born 19 November 1997) is a Slovenian footballer who plays as a midfielder for Estonian club Levadia.

Career

Zemplín Michalovce
Mavretič made his professional Slovak Super Liga debut for Zemplín Michalovce against iClinic Sereď on 4 May 2019. He played the entire duration of the 2–2 tie and was booked in the first half with a yellow card.

References

External links
 
 

1997 births
Living people
Slovenian footballers
Association football midfielders
Slovenian expatriate footballers
NK Bravo players
S.S. Monopoli 1966 players
MFK Zemplín Michalovce players
NK Domžale players
ND Gorica players
NK Tabor Sežana players
FCI Levadia Tallinn players
Serie C players
Slovak Super Liga players
Slovenian PrvaLiga players
Meistriliiga players
Expatriate footballers in Italy
Slovenian expatriate sportspeople in Italy
Expatriate footballers in Slovakia
Slovenian expatriate sportspeople in Slovakia
Expatriate footballers in Estonia
Slovenian expatriate sportspeople in Estonia
Place of birth missing (living people)